Marie-Claire Bancquart (21 July 1932 – 19 February 2019) was a French poet, essayist, professor emerita and literary critic. She was the recipient of the Grand prix de la Critique littéraire of the Académie Française, the premier authority on matters related to French language and culture, as well as numerous other awards. Her poetry is known for its visceral nature, often exploring the interior of the human body as a means of exploring emotion and humanity.

Bancquart was president of the French arts council La Maison de la Poésie, and a professor emerita of the Université Paris-Sorbonne. Bancquart has been described as one of the most "powerful" voices in contemporary French poetry, drawing comparisons to French poet Charles Baudelaire. In addition to her many volumes of poetry, Bancquart has also published books and essays on subjects such as surrealism and Anatole France.

She was married to French composer Alain Bancquart.

Published works
 Poetry
 Mais, Vodaine, 1969
 Projets alternés, Rougerie, 1972
 Mains dissoutes, Rougerie, 1975
 Cherche-terre, Saint-Germain des prés, 1977
 Mémoire d'abolie, Belfond 1978
 Habiter le sel, Pierre Dalle Nogare, 1979
 Partition, Belfond, 1981
 Votre visage jusqu'à l'os, Temps Actuels, 1983
 Opportunité des oiseaux, Belfond, 1986
 Opéra des limites, José Corti, 1988
 Végétales, Les cahiers du Confluent, 1988
 Sans lieu sinon l'attente, Obsidiane, 1991
 Dans le feuilletage de la terre, Belfond, 1994
 Énigmatiques, Obsidiane, 1995
 La Vie, lieu-dit, Obsidiane en coédition avec Noroît (Canada), 1997
 La Paix saignée, précédée de Contrées du corps natal, Obsidiane, 1999
 Voilé/dévoilé, éditions Trait d'Union, Montréal, 2000
 Avec la mort, quartier d'orange entre les dents, Obsidiane, 2005
 Verticale du secret, Amourier, 2007
 Terre énergumène, Le Castor Astral, 2009
 Explorer l'incertain, Amourier, 2010
 Violente vie, Le Castor Astral, 2012

 Novels
 L'Inquisiteur, Belfond, 1980
 Les Tarots d'Ulysse, Belfond, 1984
 Photos de famille, François Bourin, 1988
 Elise en automne, François Bourin, 1991
 La Saveur du sel, Bourin / Julliard, 1994
 Une femme sans modèles, éditions de Fallois, 1999

 Essays
 Paris des surréalistes, Seguers, 1973
 Maupassant conteur fantastique, Minard, 1976, rééd. 1993
 Anatole France, un sceptique passionné, Calmann-Lévy, 1984
 Images littéraires de Paris fin de siècle, la Différence, 1979
 Poésie française 1945-1970 (sous la dir.), PUF 1995
 Fin de siècle gourmande, 1880-1900, PUF, 2001
 Écrivains fin-de-siècle, Gallimard, 2010

References

Further reading
Broome, P. (2008). In the Flesh of the Text: The Poetry of Marie-Claire Bancquart. Amsterdam ; New York, NY: Rodopi.

Winners of the Prix Broquette-Gonin (literature)
Prix Sainte-Beuve winners
20th-century French novelists
21st-century French novelists
20th-century French women writers
French literary critics
French women literary critics
French women critics
French women essayists
French women poets
20th-century French essayists
20th-century French poets
21st-century French poets
People from Aveyron
1932 births
2019 deaths
21st-century French women writers